Gujarat Alkalies and Chemicals Limited (GACL) is an Indian chemical substance manufacturing company, promoted by the Government of Gujarat. Its manufacturing facilities are located at Dahej and Vadodara in Gujarat. The company manufactures chemicals such as caustic soda, sodium cyanide, chloromethanes, sodium ferrocyanide, caustic potash, potassium carbonate, hydrochloric acid, phosphoric acid (85%) and hydrogen peroxide.

History 
GACL was incorporated by Gujarat Industrial Investment Corporation (GIIC) on 29 March 1973. The Government of Gujarat is the owner and major promoter of GACL. The production began in 1976 at Vadodara plant with 37,425 MTPA capacity of caustic soda. The company along with other corporations like GSFC, Petrofils Co-operative Ltd. and Gujarat Electricity Board promoted GIPCL Vadodara Gas based Power Station to fulfill electricity demand. After subsequent expansion at both Vadodara and Dahej plant the total caustic soda productions reach 4,29,050 MTPA.

GNAL 
GACL and National Aluminium Company (NALCO) will jointly expands the GACL's plant at Dahej. The GNAL named joint ventured plant will have capacity of 266667 MTPA caustic soda plant along with 130 MW CPP at Dahej. The equity holding of GACL and NALCO for the GNAL is in the ratio of 60: 40. NALCO will purchase minimum 50,000 MTPA caustic soda from GNAL for its aluminium refineries.

See also 
 Deepak Nitrite

References 

Chemical companies of India
Manufacturing companies of India
1973 establishments in Gujarat
Companies based in Vadodara
Manufacturing companies established in 1973
Indian companies established in 1973
Companies listed on the National Stock Exchange of India
Companies listed on the Bombay Stock Exchange